The 1947 Duke Blue Devils football team was an American football team that represented Duke University as a member of the Southern Conference during the 1947 college football season. In its 13th season under head coach Wallace Wade, the team compiled a 4–3–2 record (3–1–1 against conference opponents), was ranked No. 19 in the final AP Poll, and outscored opponents by a total of 90 to 79.

Schedule

References

Duke
Duke Blue Devils football seasons
Duke Blue Devils football